Gilbert Ovens (1884 or 1885–17 March 1963) was a professional association footballer who played in the Southern League for Bristol Rovers and Queens Park Rangers, as well as being on the books of Football League side Chelsea.

Ovens, who was born in Bristol, began his career with his home town club Bristol Rovers. He made a total of 66 appearances for them in the then-professional Southern League before being signed by Chelsea in 1910. He later returned to Southern League football with QPR.

References

1880s births
Year of birth uncertain
1963 deaths
Footballers from Bristol
English footballers
Association football defenders
Bristol Rovers F.C. players
Chelsea F.C. players
Queens Park Rangers F.C. players